Metrosideros albiflora, also known as large white rātā, Northland white rātā, akatea or simply white rātā, is a forest liane or vine endemic to New Zealand. It is one of three white flowering rātā vines (the others being white rātā and small white rātā). The name "albiflora" indeed literally means white flowered. Despite the similar names, large white rātā is distinguished by its much larger leaves and flowers. Its flowers are amongst the largest of any rātā, similar in size to both scarlet rātā and pōhutukawa. It occurs almost exclusively in Kauri forests from the northern Kaimai Ranges to Te Paki at the top of the North Island.

Description
The flowers of M. albiflora are a pure white, with flowering between October and March. Leaves grow up to 9 cm long and are leathery, and the vine can grow up to 10m high. If no support is available, it will instead form a large bush, and example of this can be seen in Waima, Northland in regenerating bush.

Conservation
As of 2012, M. albiflora is not regarded as threatened.

Cultivation
Metrosideros albiflora has a reputation for being exacting and difficult and is not common in cultivation. It is however available form specialist plant nurseries. In addition to the large white flowers, its new foliage is a reddish colour. It strongly prefers a situation where its base is afforded shade and it is not permitted to dry out excessively.

There is one known cultivar of large white rātā, Metrosideros albiflora 'Northland', which is listed in the Blue Mountain Nurseries catalog.

See also 
 Carmine/Crimson Rātā
 Colenso's Rātā
 Scarlet Rātā
 Small White Rātā
 White Rātā

References

Further reading
Salmon, J.T., 1986. The Native Trees of New Zealand. Wellington: Heinneman Reed.
Simpson, P., 2005. Pōhutukawa & Rātā: New Zealand's Iron-Hearted Trees. Wellington: Te Papa Press.

External links

albiflora
Endemic flora of New Zealand
Trees of New Zealand
Garden plants of New Zealand